The Don Peninsula is a peninsula in British Columbia, Canada. It extends southwest between the Mathieson and Spiller Channels in the Milbanke Sound area. Later discovered to be a peninsula, it was first charted as an island.

References

Peninsulas of British Columbia
North Coast of British Columbia